Edenburg is a town south of Bloemfontein in Free State province, South Africa.

Edenburg may also refer to:

 Edenburg, Gauteng, South Africa
 Edenburg, Pennsylvania, United States
 Edenburg, Saskatchewan, Canada

See also
 Edinburg (disambiguation)
 Edinburgh (disambiguation)